Sir Thomas Lachlan Macdonald  (14 December 1898 – 11 April 1980) was a New Zealand politician of the National Party. He served as Minister of Defence (1949–1957), Minister of External Affairs (1954–1957), and Minister of Island Territories (1955–1957), and was New Zealand High Commissioner to the United Kingdom (1961–1968).

Early life and war service
Macdonald was born in Invercargill on 14 December 1898, to parents Thomas Forsaith Macdonald, a farmer, and Margaret Ann Matheson. One of his great-grandfathers, Thomas Forsaith, was a member of the 1st New Zealand Parliament. Macdonald was educated at South School and Southland Boys' High School. He served in the New Zealand Expeditionary Force in Palestine in the First World War, and in the Second World War he served in Egypt, rising to the rank of captain until he was invalided home in 1943.

Political career

Macdonald was the Member of Parliament for Mataura  to 1946, then Wallace  to 1957, when he retired. He was Minister of Defence (1949–1957), Minister of External Affairs (1954–1957), and Minister of Island Territories (1955–1957) in the First National Government. From 1961 to 1968 he was the New Zealand High Commissioner to the United Kingdom.

Later life and death
In the 1963 New Year Honours, Macdonald was appointed a Knight Commander of the Order of St Michael and St George. He died in 1980.

Mount Macdonald in Antarctica was named for him by the New Zealand Geological Survey Antarctic Expedition (1961–62).

Notes

References

|-

1898 births
1980 deaths
People educated at Southland Boys' High School
New Zealand Knights Commander of the Order of St Michael and St George
New Zealand defence ministers
New Zealand foreign ministers
New Zealand National Party MPs
New Zealand military personnel of World War I
New Zealand military personnel of World War II
People from Invercargill
New Zealand people of Scottish descent
High Commissioners of New Zealand to the United Kingdom
Members of the New Zealand House of Representatives
New Zealand MPs for South Island electorates
20th-century New Zealand politicians
New Zealand politicians awarded knighthoods